Danxia may refer to:

 Mount Danxia, scenic mountain in Guangdong, China
 Danxia landform, named after the mountain
 China Danxia, collective name of six areas of Danxia landform inscribed on the World Heritage Site

See also
 Zhangye Danxia National Geological Park